Events from the year 1758 in Denmark.

Incumbents
 Monarch – Frederick V
 Prime minister – Johan Ludvig Holstein-Ledreborg

Events

Undated
 The ballet dancers Marie Barch and Carl Vilhelm Barch debut at the Royal Danish Theater in Copenhagen as the first native ballet dancers.

Births
 6 November – Andreas Birch, academic, bishop (died 1829)
 16 November – Peter Andreas Heiberg, author (died 1841)

Deaths
 13 September Peter Norden Sølling (died 1827)
 30 January – Carl Adolph von Plessen, statesman (born 1678 in Mecklenburg)
 5 November - Hans Egede, missionary (born 1686)

References

 
1750s in Denmark
Denmark
Years of the 18th century in Denmark